Dimitar Dobrev Dobrev was a 20th-Century Bulgarian naval officer and an I-Class Admiral. He was a participant in the Serbo-Bulgarian War, Russo-Japanese War, First Balkan War and the Second Balkan War.

Biography

Education
In 1883 he graduated from a school in Moscow.

In 1883 he was admitted to the Vasil Levski National Military University in Sofia, where he graduated.

He passed the examinations in the Provisional Course for Naval Officers in March 1893 and May 1895, respectively, with which he acquired the qualification of naval officer.

In the period 1896 - 1897 Dobrev studied and graduated from the Torpedo officer class at the Royal and Imperial Naval School in Pula, Austria-Hungary.

In 1903, Lieutenant Dobrev was enlisted in the Artillery Officer Class of the Russian Imperial Navy in Kronstadt, graduating the following year.

Military career
As a volunteer in the rank of cadet he participated in the Serbo-Bulgarian War in the ranks of the 1st Infantry Sofia Regiment, as commanding polurota in the fighting with. Bregovitsa and Malovo on November 3. Later commanding the II Company, which participated in the Battle of Gurguliat, he was awarded the Soldier's Cross "For Valor" IV degree. After the war he returned to the Military School and continued his education. As a cadet he took part in the dethronement of Prince Alexander I. He was part of the convoy of Prince Alexander Battenberg when he was taken out of the country. After the counter-coup, Dobrev was removed from the Military School, but was later pardoned, as a result of which he managed to finish school.

In 1889 he was promoted to the rank of lieutenant and in the same year he entered the service in the Bulgarian Navy and the Naval Unit in Ruse. In October 1899 he was already a watch officer and head of the torpedo armament of the training cruiser Nadezhda.

In early 1904, Dobrev decided to take part in the Russo-Japanese War. He sent a report to the Ministry of Defense requesting that he be allowed to participate in the Second Pacific Squadron of the Russian Imperial Navy. He obtained the prior consent of the Chief of the Training and Artillery Detachment and the Chief of the General Naval Staff of the Russian Empire. In a late report, Dobrev develops the idea that he and the Bulgarian naval officers were interested in the idea of submarines. This was just the beginning, with many accidents, which is why Dobrev's interest spoke his progressive views.

In August 1904 he was allowed to be sent on practical long-distance voyages with the Russian Imperial Navy. In June–July 1904, Lieutenant Dobrev sailed with the battleship "Nicholas I" and the cruiser Vladimir Monomakh. On October 15, 1904, the Second Pacific Squadron took over from the port of Libava on the Baltic Sea to Vladivostok. The young lieutenant Dobrev was enlisted as an artillery officer. On May 15, 1905, as a member of the crew of the old cruiser Dmitry Donski, Dobrev took part in the Battle of Tsushima. On the same day, the cruiser was sunk and Dobrev was captured by the Japanese. On October 30, he was handed over to the Russian authorities and sailed for Vladivostok. From there - to St. Petersburg, where he arrived on November 30, 1905. In February 1906 he returned to Bulgaria. For his participation in the war, Lieutenant Dobrev was awarded the Bulgarian Order "Order of Saint Alexander”, IV degree with swords and with the Russian order“St. Vladimir"IV degree with swords and bow" for his special feats of bravery and self-sacrifice in battle with the Japanese fleet on 14–15 May 1905. "

After his return to Bulgaria, Dimitar Dobrev successively held the following positions:

Head of the Machine School at the NCV Fleet (1906 - 1908).
Chief of Mobile Defense.
Commander of the cruiser "Hope".
Senior Adjutant at His Majesty's Navy Headquarters.

In 1911 he was dismissed from His Majesty's Navy.

During the First Balkan War, he was mobilized. At the beginning he was appointed head of the Traffic Light Monitoring Service, and then on November 1, 1912, he was re-appointed head of the Mobile Defense.

Captain II rank Dobrev commanded the destroyer detachment, which on November 7–8, 1912 successfully attacked the Turkish cruiser "Hamidie", for which he was awarded the "Order of Bravery" III degree.

During the Second Balkan War, he commanded the Bulgarian detachment of battleships (or "Nadezhda" and six destroyers) and transport ships (five steamers of the Bulgarian Shipping Company) during their internment in Sevastopol, so as not to fall into the hands of the advancing enemy. and in Sevastopol he appeared not only as a commander but also as a diplomat.

In 1914 Captain I rank Dimitar Dobrev left His Majesty's Fleet and worked for many years as a lawyer in Veliko Tarnovo.

In the present time, a ship with an auxiliary purpose in the Navy of the Republic of Bulgaria is named after Captain I rank Dimitar Dobrev.

Awards
Order of Bravery, IV degree (1885)
Order of Saint Alexander, IV degree with swords (1906)
St. Vladimir, IV degree with swords and bow (1906)
Order of Bravery, III degree (1912)

References

Bibliography
 
 
 Assoc. Pavlov: The participation of Chap. I rank D. Dobrev in the Russo-Japanese War 

Bulgarian generals
Bulgarian military personnel of the Balkan Wars
People of the Serbo-Bulgarian War
Bulgarian military personnel of World War I
1868 births
1944 deaths
Russian military personnel of the Russo-Japanese War